The doldrums, also called the "equatorial calms", are the calms and light baffling winds at the Intertropical Convergence Zone.

Doldrums may also refer to:

Music
 Doldrums (band), an American post-rock band
Doldrums (musical project), a Canadian electronic music project
 The Doldrums (album), 2000 album by Ariel Pink
 The Doldrums (EP), 2004 album by Josh Pyke
 Doldrums, a record label of Joy Orbison

Other
 "In the Doldrums", an expression used, particularly in the United Kingdom, to describe somebody as being in low spirits or dull and drowsy.
 The Doldrums, a fictional place in Norton Juster's novel The Phantom Tollbooth (1961)